Storm King Mountain is a mountain in the White River National Forest of the Rocky Mountains,  northwest of Glenwood Springs, Colorado, in northeastern Garfield County. It is on the north side of the Colorado River and Interstate 70 (I-70), between Glenwood Springs and New Castle.A ski lift at the Copper Mountain  Ski   Resort is named after the mountain.

July 1994 fire
It is the site of the July 1994 South Canyon Fire in which 14 firefighters died. After the fire eliminated valuable vegetation and ground cover, torrential rains caused a mudslide on the night of September 1, 1994, that buried 30 cars and seriously injured two people on Interstate 70.

See also

List of Colorado mountain ranges
List of Colorado mountain summits
List of Colorado fourteeners
List of Colorado 4000 meter prominent summits
List of the most prominent summits of Colorado
List of Colorado county high points

References

External links

Mountains of Colorado
Mountains of Garfield County, Colorado
North American 2000 m summits
White River National Forest